The League of Ireland (LOI), is a league of professional football clubs from the Republic of Ireland and Northern Ireland. It is one of the two main governing bodies responsible for organising association football in the Republic of Ireland along with the Football Association of Ireland. It is the top-level football league in the Republic of Ireland from its foundation in 1921-22 but the term was originally used to refer to a single division league. However today the League of Ireland features five divisions – the Premier Division, the First Division, U19 Division, U17 Division, U15 Division and starting U13 Division. The League of Ireland has always worked closely with the FAI and in 2006 the two bodies formally merged. All the divisions are currently sponsored by Airtricity and as a result the league is also known as the SSE Airtricity League. In 2007, it became one of the first leagues in Europe to introduce a salary cap.

The LOI is divided into the Premier Division and the First Division with 10 clubs in each division, 20 in total, with promotion and relegation between the top First Division clubs change places with the lowest-placed clubs in the Premier Division. Underage divisions include thr U19 Division, U17 Division, U15 Division and starting U13 Division. Currently one of the LOO clubs are from Northern Ireland – Derry City – the rest of the 20 are located in the Republic of Ireland.

The League of Ireland was a single division before the league was rebranded as the League of Ireland Premier Division in the 1985-86 season.

The League of Ireland also organises two knock-out cup competitions, the FAI Cup and the League of Ireland Cup.

History

A Division
The League of Ireland was founded in 1921 as a single division known as the A Division. The first season featured eight teams, all from County Dublin. The teams that competed in the first season were Bohemians, Dublin United, Frankfort, Jacobs, Olympia, St. James's Gate, Shelbourne and YMCA. The eight founding members had spent the 1920–21 season playing in the Leinster Senior League. Bohemians and Shelbourne had played in the 1919–20 Irish League. St James's Gate were the inaugural champions. Gate also went on to complete a treble having already won both the 1921–22 FAI Cup and 1921–22 Leinster Senior Cup. In 1922–23 the league was expanded to twelve clubs. Among the new members were Shamrock Rovers, who finished as champions, and Athlone Town who became the first team from outside County Dublin to compete in the league. Together with fellow Dublin clubs teams, Bohemians and Shelbourne, Shamrock Rovers would go onto dominate the league during the 1920s and the 1930s.

In 1924–25 Bray Unknowns and Fordsons became the second and third teams from outside County Dublin to join the league. Fordsons also became the first team from Munster to play in the league.
The league continued to expand numerically and geographically during its first two decades of existence. In 1926–27 Dundalk were elected to the league and in 1932–33 became the first club from outside County Dublin to win the title. Dundalk were subsequently joined by Waterford in 1930–31, Cork Bohemians in 1932–33,
Sligo Rovers in 1934–35 and Limerick F.C. in 1937–38. In 1936–37, Sligo Rovers became the second club from outside County Dublin to win the title. During The Emergency/Second World War era Cork United emerged as the league's strongest team. The club won five league titles between 1940–41 and 1945–46, including three in succession. However they subsequently resigned from the league in 1948.

The 1950s was marked by the emergence of St Patrick's Athletic and the re-emergence of Shamrock Rovers. The former succeeded in winning the title at the first attempt in 1951–52 and claimed a further two in the middle of the decade. In 1953–54 the Coad's Colts earned Shamrock Rovers their first title in fifteen years. Drumcondra and Dundalk claimed two League of Ireland titles each during the 1960s but Waterford secured their status as the team of the decade with four league titles, including three in succession between 1967–68 and 1969–70. Six clubs won the League of Ireland title during the 1970s with Waterford, Bohemians and Dundalk winning two titles each. Athlone Town won two league titles at the start of the 1980s but the decade was marked by the four successive league titles won by Shamrock Rovers between 1983–84 and 1986–87. Following the conclusion of the 1984–85 season the league was restructured and the A Division was replaced by the League of Ireland Premier Division.

Second level
The League of Ireland first organised a second level division in 1964–65. The B Division featured reserve teams and emerging senior teams. Although there was no relegation and promotion to and from the A Division, a number of B Division teams, including Home Farm, Bray Wanderers, Athlone Town, UCD, Longford Town and Monaghan United, were subsequently elected to the A Division. In 1985–86 the B Division was replaced as the second level division by the First Division. The First Division featured first teams and a relegation and promotion system operated with the new Premier Division.

Third level
Between 2008 and 2011 the FAI organised a short lived national third level league known as the A Championship. Like the earlier the B Division, the A Championship featured a mixture of League of Ireland reserve teams and emerging senior teams. Unlike the B Division, a promotion and relegation system operated between the Premier Division, the First Division and the A Championship.

Youth leagues
Since 2000–01 the League of Ireland has organised a youth league. It was originally an under-21 league, later becoming an under-20 league, but is now an U19 league. The winners of the overall competition are awarded the Dr Tony O'Neill Cup. In 2015, the League of Ireland also introduced an U17 league. An under-15 league was introduced in 2017, beginning with a truncated season, before fully aligning with the League of Ireland calendar in 2018. An under-13 league is planned to start April 2019.

Competition

League 
The LOI's 20 member clubs are grouped into two divisions: the League of Ireland Premier Division, and League of Ireland First Division (previously the League of Ireland A Division, and League of Ireland B Division respectively; they were renamed in the 1985-86 season). Each division has 10 clubs, and in any given season a club plays each of the others in the same division four times (3 in First Division), twice at their home stadium and twice at that of their opponent's. This makes for a total of 36 games played each season (27 in First Division).

Clubs gain three points for a win, one for a draw, and none for a defeat. At the end of the season, clubs at the top of the First Division may win promotion to the next higher division. One First Division club wins promotion directly to the Premier Division, with the bottom Premier Division club taking their place. A second First Division club may get promoted through the promotion/relegation playoff. To sustain interest for more clubs over the length of the season one promotion playoff spot from the first division is decided according to a playoff between four clubs, which takes place at the end of the season. The playoff winner plays the 9th place Premier Division club to determine the last spot in the following seasons Premier Division.

Promotion and relegation are determined by final league positions, but to sustain interest for more clubs over the length of the season one promotion place from each division is decided according to a playoff between four clubs, which takes place at the end of the season. It is possible for a team finishing sixth in the Championship or League One, or seventh in League Two, to be promoted rather than the clubs finishing immediately above them in the standings.

Since the 2004–05 season, penalties have existed for clubs entering financial administration during the season. If a club enters administration before 31 March of any given season, they will immediately be deducted 12 points; entering administration from 1 April onward will see the points deduction either held over until the end of the season (if the club finishes outside the relegation places) or applied the following season (if the club was relegated anyway). Also, it is required that a club exiting administration agrees to a Creditor's Voluntary Agreement, and pays in full any other footballing creditors. Failure to do either of these will result in a second, potentially unlimited (though in practice usually between 15 and 20) points deduction.

The other main situation in which is a club may lose points is by fielding an improperly registered or otherwise ineligible player. If a club is found to have done this, then any points earned from any match that player participated in will be deducted; the opposing club(s) do not earn any points from this, however.

League of Ireland clubs

2023 Premier Division

2023 First Division

Former League of Ireland clubs

Past League Winners

League of Ireland A Division/Premier Division

A Division

League of Ireland Premier Division

League of Ireland titles 
Includes First Division titles.

General Statistics

List of winners by club

List of winners by county

Season by season
For each season, the number of teams competing (in brackets) are shown.

Media coverage
League of Ireland games are broadcast by both RTÉ and Eir Sport. In 2014 it was announced that RTÉ will show 78 live Premier Division and FAI Cup games as part of a new agreement with the FAI. The agreement expires in November 2018. RTÉ also broadcast a highlights show, Soccer Republic, throughout the season. In 2015 the FAI agreed a deal with TrackChamp to stream all Premier Division and First Division  outside Ireland - though customers criticised this as they had to sign up for a betting account first.

Premier Division Attendance

European record

UEFA Champions League

 1QR/2QR/3QR = First/Second/Third qualifying round; PO = Playoff

UEFA Europa League

 1QR/2QR/3QR = First/Second/Third qualifying round; PO = Playoff; Group = Group stage

UEFA Europa Conference League

 1QR/2QR/3QR = First/Second/Third qualifying round; PO = Playoff

See also 

 List of association football competitions
 List of foreign League of Ireland players

Notes

References

External links
 Official Website

 
Sports leagues established in 1921
1921 establishments in Ireland